Glenn Gawdin (born March 25, 1997) is a Canadian professional ice hockey centre currently playing with the San Diego Gulls in the American Hockey League (AHL) while under contract with the Anaheim Ducks of the National Hockey League (NHL). He was selected by the St. Louis Blues in the fourth-round (116th overall) of the 2015 NHL Entry Draft.

Playing career

Major junior
Growing up in Richmond, British Columbia, Gawdin began playing hockey through the Seafair Minor Hockey Association. In 2009, Gawdin played with the minor ice hockey team, the Richmond Blues, as they competed in the Pacific Coast Amateur Hockey Association playoffs. He scored a hat-trick and was later named PeeWee-A . Gawdin was allowed to bypass minor hockey a year early to play with the Seafair Islanders Midget A1 team.

At the age of 15, Gawdin played major midget hockey with the Greater Vancouver Canadians while studying at McRoberts Secondary School. That year, he was drafted fifth overall by the Swift Current Broncos in the 2012 WHL Bantam Draft and became the first Broncos player from his draft class to sign with the team. During the 2012–13 season, he played two games with the Swift Current Broncos after scoring 25 points in 18 games with the Greater Vancouver Canadians. The following season, Gawdin became a mainstay on the Broncos line up where he put up 22 points in 66 games as a rookie. He recorded his first WHL point with an assist on Julius Honka's first WHL goal on September 19, 2013, against the Regina Pats.

The St. Louis Blues selected Gawdin in the 4th round (116th overall) of the 2015 NHL Entry Draft, making him the first Richmond product to be drafted in an NHL Entry Draft since Raymond Sawada in 2004.

Prior to the 2016–17 season, Gawdin attended the St. Louis Blues training camp. He returned to the WHL without an NHL contract  and was named captain of the Broncos. At the conclusion of the season, Gawdin was voted Team MVP.

On November 16, 2017, Gawdin signed a 3-year entry-level contract with the Calgary Flames after attending their training camp. He returned to the WHL for the 2017–18 WHL season as an overage player, where he scored 56 goals and 69 assists as the Broncos qualified for the 2018 Memorial Cup. His 125 points were the second-highest total in the WHL, behind Jayden Halbgewachs of the Moose Jaw Warriors.  He was named WHL Player of the Month for February and selected for the WHL (East) First All-Star Team. After leading the Broncos to the 2018 WHL Championship, Gawdin was named WHL Playoffs MVP. Two days later, Gawdin was named CHL Player of the Week for the first time. At the end of the season, Gawdin revealed that he had played through a shoulder injury.

Professional
After attending the Calgary Flames 2018 training camp, Gawdin was reassigned to their American Hockey League (AHL) affiliate, the Stockton Heat. He made the Heat's opening night roster and recorded his first professional goal in a 6–5 loss to the Ontario Reign on October 6.

He was awarded the Junior Male Athlete Award by the Richmond Sports Council on April 26, 2019.

As a free agent from the Flames after four seasons, Gawdin was signed to a two-year, $1.525 million contract with the Anaheim Ducks on July 13, 2022.

International play
Gawdin has represented Team British Columbia at the 2012 Western Canada U16 Challenge Cup where he won a gold medal. He later competed with Team Pacific at the 2014 World U-17 Hockey Challenge where he helped them win silver. The following year, Gawdin was named to Team Canada's junior team to compete in the 2015 IIHF World U18 Championships.

Personal life
Gawdin was born on March 25, 1997, to parents Bryan and Yvonne.

Gawdin played both ice hockey and lacrosse growing up. He competed with the Team BC Bantam lacrosse team.

Career statistics

Regular season and playoffs

International

Awards and honours

References

External links
 

1997 births
Living people
Anaheim Ducks players
Calgary Flames players
Canadian ice hockey centres
Canadian lacrosse players
San Diego Gulls (AHL) players
Stockton Heat players
Swift Current Broncos players
Ice hockey people from British Columbia
St. Louis Blues draft picks
EHC Visp players